Hampton is the coastal west end of Herne Bay, Kent, England. Formerly the site of the village of Hampton-on-Sea, the settlement is underwater due to massive coastal erosion, but it was on the west side of the northern end of Hampton Pier Avenue, between the 1959 sea defences and the remains of the sea wall which are exposed at low water in Hampton bay. When Hampton-on-Sea existed and until 1934, the Hampton-on-Sea site was under the jurisdiction of Blean Rural District Council, the boundary with Herne Bay Council running north–south along the line of the present-day Hampton Pier Avenue. In 1934, the area was transferred to Herne Bay Urban District Council, and in 1974 to Canterbury City Council.

References

Herne Bay, Kent